Fissidens is a genus of haplolepideous mosses (Dicranidae) in the family Fissidentaceae.

Selected species:

 Fissidens abbreviatus
 Fissidens acacioides
 Fissidens aciphyllus
 Fissidens acreanus
 Fissidens acutissimus
 Fissidens adianthoides
 Fissidens aeruginosus
 Fissidens afissidens
 Fissidens afropapillosus
 Fissidens aggestus
 Fissidens alatus
 Fissidens albo-limbatus
 Fissidens alexandrinus
 Fissidens allionii
 Fissidens allisonii
 Fissidens allorgei
 Fissidens alomoides
 Fissidens amazonicus
 Fissidens amoenus
 Fissidens amplifolius
 Fissidens ampliretis
 Fissidens andicola
 Fissidens angustelimbatus
 Fissidens angustifolius
 Fissidens angustinervis
 Fissidens anisophyllus
 Fissidens annamensis
 Fissidens anomalus
 Fissidens antrophyi
 Fissidens aoraiensis
 Fissidens aphelotaxifolius
 Fissidens aporrocheilos
 Fissidens appalachensis
 Fissidens arboreus
 Fissidens arcticus
 Fissidens arcuatulus
 Fissidens arnigadhensis
 Fissidens arnoldii
 Fissidens asplenioides
 Fissidens asselii
 Fissidens autoicus
 Fissidens azoricus
 Fissidens badoglioi
 Fissidens badyinbarus
 Fissidens barretoi
 Fissidens basilaris
 Fissidens beccarii
 Fissidens beckettii
 Fissidens berterii
 Fissidens bessouensis
 Fissidens biformis
 Fissidens bilaspurense
 Fissidens bistratosus
 Fissidens blechnoides
 Fissidens bogoriensis
 Fissidens bogosicus
 Fissidens boninensis
 Fissidens borgenii
 Fissidens bourgaeanus
 Fissidens brachypus
 Fissidens brassii
 Fissidens braunii
 Fissidens brevidorsus
 Fissidens brevifolius
 Fissidens brevifrons
 Fissidens brevilingulatus
 Fissidens brevipes
 Fissidens bryoides
 Fissidens bushii
 Fissidens caespitosus
 Fissidens cagoui
 Fissidens calcicola
 Fissidens cambewarrae
 Fissidens canalae
 Fissidens capitatus
 Fissidens capitulatus
 Fissidens capriviensis
 Fissidens carnosus
 Fissidens celticus
 Fissidens ceylonensis
 Fissidens clebschii
 Fissidens closteri
 Fissidens coacervatus
 Fissidens collinus
 Fissidens commutatus
 Fissidens consociatus
 Fissidens crassinervis
 Fissidens crassipes
 Fissidens crenulatus
 Fissidens crispifolius
 Fissidens crispulus
 Fissidens crispus
 Fissidens cryptoneuron
 Fissidens cucullatus
 Fissidens curvatus
 Fissidens cuspidifer
 Fissidens cuynetii
 Fissidens cylindraceus
 Fissidens cylindrothecus
 Fissidens cyprius
 Fissidens dalamair
 Fissidens daltoniaefolius
 Fissidens danckelmanii
 Fissidens darntyi
 Fissidens darwinianus
 Fissidens dealbatus
 Fissidens decursivus
 Fissidens delicatulus
 Fissidens dendeliensis
 Fissidens dendrophilus
 Fissidens diaphanodontus
 Fissidens diaphanus
 Fissidens dietrichiae
 Fissidens diplodus
 Fissidens discolor
 Fissidens dissitifolius
 Fissidens diversifolius
 Fissidens dongensis
 Fissidens dubius
 Fissidens dumbeanus
 Fissidens duttonii
 Fissidens edamensis
 Fissidens elamellosus
 Fissidens elegans
 Fissidens elongatus
 Fissidens enervis
 Fissidens ernestii
 Fissidens erosulus
 Fissidens euryloma
 Fissidens excedens
 Fissidens excurrentinervis
 Fissidens exiguus
 Fissidens exilis
 Fissidens exsul
 Fissidens faniensis
 Fissidens fasciculatus
 Fissidens fautauae
 Fissidens filicicola
 Fissidens filiformis
 Fissidens firmus
 Fissidens fissicaulis
 Fissidens flabellatus
 Fissidens flabellulus
 Fissidens flaccidus
 Fissidens florschuetzii
 Fissidens fluitans
 Fissidens fontanus
 Fissidens formosanus
 Fissidens forsythii
 Fissidens fritzei
 Fissidens fujiensis
 Fissidens fuscoviridis
 Fissidens ganguleei
 Fissidens gardneri
 Fissidens gaultieri
 Fissidens geijskesii
 Fissidens geminiflorus
 Fissidens georgianus
 Fissidens geppii
 Fissidens gillianus
 Fissidens giraldii
 Fissidens gladiolus
 Fissidens glaucissimus
 Fissidens glossobryoides
 Fissidens gomae
 Fissidens goyazensis
 Fissidens gracilescens
 Fissidens gracilifolius
 Fissidens grainvillei
 Fissidens grandifolius
 Fissidens grandifrons
 Fissidens granulatus
 Fissidens griffithii
 Fissidens grossiretis
 Fissidens guangdongensis
 Fissidens guianensis
 Fissidens gymnocarpus
 Fissidens gymnogynus
 Fissidens gymnostomus
 Fissidens haconicus
 Fissidens hadii
 Fissidens hallianus
 Fissidens hampeanus
 Fissidens helenicus
 Fissidens henryae
 Fissidens herzogii
 Fissidens hildebrandtii
 Fissidens hillianus
 Fissidens hirsutus
 Fissidens hoeegii
 Fissidens hoei
 Fissidens hollianus
 Fissidens homomallulus
 Fissidens hookerioides
 Fissidens horizonticarpus
 Fissidens hornschuchii
 Fissidens humilis
 Fissidens hyalinus
 Fissidens hydropogon
 Fissidens hylogenes
 Fissidens hylophilus
 Fissidens hymenodon
 Fissidens hyophilus
 Fissidens idanreensis
 Fissidens imbricatus
 Fissidens inaequalilimbatus
 Fissidens inaequalis
 Fissidens inaequiretis
 Fissidens incertus
 Fissidens incisus
 Fissidens inclinis
 Fissidens incognitus
 Fissidens inconspicuus
 Fissidens incurvus
 Fissidens integerrimus
 Fissidens integrifolius
 Fissidens intromarginatus
 Fissidens involutus
 Fissidens iwatsukii
 Fissidens jaiorum
 Fissidens jansenii
 Fissidens jap-amabilis
 Fissidens javanicus
 Fissidens jeffreyi
 Fissidens jungermannioides
 Fissidens jungermanniopsis
 Fissidens kalimpongensis
 Fissidens karataviensis
 Fissidens karwarensis
 Fissidens kilaueae
 Fissidens kinabaluensis
 Fissidens kondoi
 Fissidens kosaninii
 Fissidens kurzii
 Fissidens lachmannii
 Fissidens lacouturei
 Fissidens lagenarius
 Fissidens lancifolius
 Fissidens laosianus
 Fissidens lateralioides
 Fissidens latifolius
 Fissidens lautokensis
 Fissidens laxetexturatus
 Fissidens laxitextus
 Fissidens lepidopiloides
 Fissidens leptocheilos
 Fissidens leptocladus
 Fissidens leptophyllus
 Fissidens le-testui
 Fissidens leucocinctus
 Fissidens leucodictyus
 Fissidens leucopteris
 Fissidens liliputanus
 Fissidens limbinervis
 Fissidens lindbergii
 Fissidens linearilimbatus
 Fissidens linearis
 Fissidens littlei
 Fissidens loennbergii
 Fissidens longevaginatus
 Fissidens longicaulis
 Fissidens longifolius
 Fissidens longisetus
 Fissidens luisierii
 Fissidens luteofuscus
 Fissidens luteo-limbatus
 Fissidens macleanus
 Fissidens macrobryoides
 Fissidens macrodus
 Fissidens macroglossus
 Fissidens macrosporoides
 Fissidens macrosporus
 Fissidens madecassus
 Fissidens marginatulus
 Fissidens mariei
 Fissidens marthae
 Fissidens maschalanthus
 Fissidens megalotis
 Fissidens menyhartii
 Fissidens metzgeria
 Fissidens michoacanus
 Fissidens microcarpus
 Fissidens microdictyon
 Fissidens micronesicus
 Fissidens minimus
 Fissidens minutifolius
 Fissidens minutipes
 Fissidens mobukensis
 Fissidens monguillonii
 Fissidens mooreae
 Fissidens multiflorus
 Fissidens nanobryoides
 Fissidens narbonensis
 Fissidens neglectus
 Fissidens neomagofukui
 Fissidens nigerianus
 Fissidens nigro-viridis
 Fissidens nobilis
 Fissidens nobreganus
 Fissidens nothotaxifolius
 Fissidens oblatus
 Fissidens obliquifolius
 Fissidens oblongifolius
 Fissidens obscurocostatus
 Fissidens obscurus
 Fissidens obtusatulus
 Fissidens obtusifolius
 Fissidens obtusissimus
 Fissidens obtuso-apiculatus
 Fissidens ocellatus
 Fissidens odontoloma
 Fissidens oediloma
 Fissidens oligistoloma
 Fissidens opacus
 Fissidens orishae
 Fissidens ornaticostatus
 Fissidens ornatus
 Fissidens osmundoides
 Fissidens ovatifolius
 Fissidens ovatus
 Fissidens pachyphyllus
 Fissidens pacificus
 Fissidens pallidinervis
 Fissidens pallidulus
 Fissidens pallidus
 Fissidens palmatus
 Fissidens palmifolius
 Fissidens parkii
 Fissidens pascuanus
 Fissidens patentifolius
 Fissidens patulifolius
 Fissidens pauperculus
 Fissidens pauperrimus
 Fissidens pechuelii
 Fissidens pellucidus
 Fissidens pellucinervis
 Fissidens peraculeatus
 Fissidens perangustus
 Fissidens perdecurrens
 Fissidens perfalcatus
 Fissidens perobtusus
 Fissidens perpellucidus
 Fissidens perplexans
 Fissidens persicus
 Fissidens perssonii
 Fissidens perumalensis
 Fissidens peruvianus
 Fissidens petrophilus
 Fissidens plagiothecioides
 Fissidens planifrons
 Fissidens platensis
 Fissidens platyneuros
 Fissidens plumosus
 Fissidens plumula
 Fissidens plurisetus
 Fissidens pocsii
 Fissidens pokhrensis
 Fissidens polyphyllus
 Fissidens polypodioides
 Fissidens polysetulus
 Fissidens porrectus
 Fissidens potieri
 Fissidens prionocheilos
 Fissidens prionodes
 Fissidens protonematicola
 Fissidens pseudoaldelphinus
 Fissidens pseudoceylonensis
 Fissidens pseudoclosteri
 Fissidens pseudo-eenii
 Fissidens pseudofirmus
 Fissidens pseudohollianus
 Fissidens pseudopallidus
 Fissidens pseudoplumosus
 Fissidens pseudorufescens
 Fissidens pugionifolius
 Fissidens pulchellus
 Fissidens punctulatus
 Fissidens purpureocaulis
 Fissidens pycnoglossus
 Fissidens pygmaeus
 Fissidens radicans
 Fissidens raiatensis
 Fissidens rambii
 Fissidens ramicola
 Fissidens ramiger
 Fissidens ramulosus
 Fissidens ranchiensis
 Fissidens ranuii
 Fissidens reflexus
 Fissidens reimersii
 Fissidens remotissimus
 Fissidens rigidulus
 Fissidens rivularis
 Fissidens robynsianus
 Fissidens rochensis
 Fissidens rosulatus
 Fissidens rufescens
 Fissidens rufinervis
 Fissidens rufulus
 Fissidens rupicola
 Fissidens ryukyuensis
 Fissidens santa-clarensis
 Fissidens saprophilus
 Fissidens sardous
 Fissidens saulensis
 Fissidens scalaris
 Fissidens scariosus
 Fissidens schiffneri
 Fissidens schusteri
 Fissidens schwabei
 Fissidens sciophyllus
 Fissidens scleromitrius
 Fissidens secundulus
 Fissidens sedgwickii
 Fissidens semicompletus
 Fissidens semilimbatus
 Fissidens semperfalcatus
 Fissidens sericeus
 Fissidens serrato-marginatus
 Fissidens serratus
 Fissidens serrulatus
 Fissidens seychellensis
 Fissidens shinii
 Fissidens siamensis
 Fissidens sigmocarpoides
 Fissidens socialis
 Fissidens somaliae
 Fissidens speluncae
 Fissidens splachnifolius
 Fissidens splachnoides
 Fissidens splendens
 Fissidens spurio-limbatus
 Fissidens steerei
 Fissidens stenophyllus
 Fissidens stenopteryx
 Fissidens stissotheca
 Fissidens stolonaceus
 Fissidens strictus
 Fissidens subangustus
 Fissidens subbasilaris
 Fissidens subbryoides
 Fissidens subdiscolor
 Fissidens subelamellosus
 Fissidens subelimbatus
 Fissidens subfirmus
 Fissidens subhumilis
 Fissidens sublimbatus
 Fissidens sublineaefolius
 Fissidens submarginatus
 Fissidens subnutans
 Fissidens subobtusatus
 Fissidens subobtusus
 Fissidens subpalmatus
 Fissidens subplanifrons
 Fissidens subpulchellus
 Fissidens subradicans
 Fissidens subramicola
 Fissidens subscleromitrius
 Fissidens subsessilis
 Fissidens subspathulatus
 Fissidens subulatifolius
 Fissidens subulatus
 Fissidens sufflatus
 Fissidens surumuensis
 Fissidens taiarapuensis
 Fissidens tapes
 Fissidens taxifolius
 Fissidens taylorii
 Fissidens teniolatus
 Fissidens terebrifolius
 Fissidens termitarum
 Fissidens terrae-reginae
 Fissidens terricola
 Fissidens teysmannianus
 Fissidens thorsbornei
 Fissidens thwaitesii
 Fissidens titalyanus
 Fissidens tonkinensis
 Fissidens tosaensis
 Fissidens townsendianus
 Fissidens usambaricus
 Fissidens valiae
 Fissidens vanzantenii
 Fissidens variolimbatus
 Fissidens ventanae
 Fissidens ventricosus
 Fissidens vesiculosus
 Fissidens victorialis
 Fissidens virens
 Fissidens vitreo-limbatus
 Fissidens vulcanicus
 Fissidens wageri
 Fissidens waiensis
 Fissidens waldheimii
 Fissidens wallisii
 Fissidens wattsii
 Fissidens weirii
 Fissidens welwitschii
 Fissidens wichurae
 Fissidens widgrenii
 Fissidens yamamotoi
 Fissidens yanoae
 Fissidens yasudae
 Fissidens yokohamensis
 Fissidens yucatanensis
 Fissidens zollingeri
 Fissidens zwickeyi

References

External links
USDA Plants Profile

Dicranales
Moss genera
Taxonomy articles created by Polbot